The Hum Tower (Bosnian: Toranj Hum / Predajnik Hum) is a  tall telecommunication tower located on Mount Hum in the periphery of Sarajevo. The original tower was finished in the 1960s, rebuilt in the 1980s. During the Bosnian war, on 2 May 1992 it was partly destroyed by the JNA and VRS.

History

Hum Tower become one of the most important landmarks of Sarajevo, capital of Bosnia and Herzegovina. 
TV transmitter was built in the 1980s at an altitude of 812 meters. It consists of a constructed object and the reinforced concrete pillar height of 78.5 meters.

On the antenna pole were installed UHF TV antenna system, VHF TV antenna system and VHF FM antenna system which broadcast analog radio and television signal. The facility was primarily used by RTV Sarajevo (Radio Televizija Sarajevo) which broadcast four radio and three television programs until 1992 (TVSA, TVSA 2, TVSA 3; Radio Sarajevo 1, Sarajevo 202, Radio Sarajevo 2 and Radio Sarajevo 3).

During the Bosnian war, in 1992, antenna tower and the building suffered major damage, which are partially repaired after the war. The building and emission devices are under constant surveillance of duty technicians from national public broadcaster, BHRT.

According to international obligations, Bosnia and Herzegovina is planned to switch to digital broadcasting in April 2014, but that deadline is breached. Within the first phase of digitalisation in BiH at the facility Hum installed DVB-T transmitter 1 KW, UHF antenna system, digital RR links and parabolic antenna. Installed DVB-T transmitter will broadcast programs of public broadcasters: BHT 1, FTV and RTRS. Commissioning of this equipment is expected in the mid-2016.

Radio and TV frequencies
 BHRT - BH Radio 1 
 BHRT - BHT 1 
 RTVFBiH - Federalni Radio 
 RTVFBiH - Federalna televizija

References

Weblinks

Architecture in Bosnia and Herzegovina
Buildings and structures in Sarajevo
Mass media in Sarajevo